McCormick is a family name that originated in Ireland, Munster and later Scotland from the Irish given name.  Spelling variations: Cormack, MacCormack, McCormack, McCormick, MacCormick, Carmack, Cormac, Cormach, Cormich and Cormiche. It comes from the first name of the original bearer. A person whose father was named Cormac would identify as Mc (i.e. "son of") Cormac; the combination was continued as the family name by subsequent generations.

Cormac is translated literally as "Charioteer, Warrior" in old Irish. The name was a very popular choice of names by parents in medieval times: this was due to the influences of the Saint of the same name. Saint Cormac Cormac mac Cuilennáin was the first Bishop of Cashel, an important diocese in the south of Ireland. Cashel was also the King of Munster and responsible for a famous book of Psalms, the Cashel Psalter, he died in battle in AD 908. See also earlier Irish saint Cormac of Armagh. In those days the McCormack was the name of a powerful Sept (Clan or Family) in the county of Longford, Cormac mac Airt, a semi-historical Irish high king who ruled from Tara ca. 227–266 AD. Cormac, son of Cabhsan, was the first chieftain to be called Cormack, and, of course, MacCormack came later as a direct descendant, Mac or Mc signifying the 'son of'.

In 1576, 1598 and 1600, MacCormicks are recorded as leading gentry in County Cork and one, of Muskerry, was influential enough to raise a large force to assist Desmond in the Elizabethan wars. The Annals of the Four Masters record the deaths of several prominent MacCormicks of County Fermanagh; the last of these died in 1431.

Another possible derivation of the name is that it comes from the Gaelic Mac Cormaic which comes from corb and mac meaning "Ravenson".

Mac, Mc prefix
Scottish and Irish patronymic surnames frequently have the prefix Mac or Mc.  When these surnames were originally developed, they were formed by adding the Gaelic word, mac, which means son of, to the name of the original bearer's father, or to the father's trade.

Business
 Cyrus McCormick (1809–1884), US inventor and businessman
 Daniel McCormick (1739/40-1834), Irish-born US businessman and banker
 David H. McCormick, business executive, former US Treasury Under Secretary for International Affairs
 Harold Fowler McCormick (1872–1941), US businessman, son of Cyrus McCormick
 Joseph B. McCormick, head of a branch at the Centers for Disease Control and Prevention
 L. Hamilton McCormick (1859–1934), US inventor and businessman, nephew of Cyrus McCormick
 Leander J. McCormick (1819–1900), US businessman and philanthropist
 Richard D. McCormick (born 1940), US businessman
 Robert Hall McCormick (1780–1846), US inventor, father of Cyrus McCormick
 Robert R. McCormick (1880–1955), US newspaper publisher
 William McCormick (born 1939), US businessman and government ambassador
 William Sanderson McCormick (1815–1865), US businessman, brother of Cyrus McCormick

Education
 Bruce H. McCormick (1928–2007), US professor of computer scientist at Texas A&M University
 Charles T. McCormick (1889–1963), US professor of law and Dean at The University of Texas, the University of North Carolina, and Northwestern University
 John McCormick (born 1954), professor of Political Science at Indiana University Purdue University Indianapolis
 Marie McCormick, the Sumner and Esther Feldberg Professor of Maternal and Child Health at Harvard T.H. Chan School of Public Health
 Richard L. McCormick (born 1947), US professor and university administrator at Rutgers University and the University of Washington
 Samuel McCormick (1858–1928), US professor and administrator of the University of Pittsburgh
 Robert J. McCormick (1948–2014), US professor of Psychology, Italian, Spanish, and Departmental Chair of Child Advocacy at Montclair State University

Entertainment
 Alyce McCormick (1899-1932), American actress and leader in the Volunteers of America
 Carolyn McCormick (born 1959), US film and television actress
 F. J. McCormick (1889–1947), Irish theater and film actor
 Gayle McCormick (1948–2016), American singer, member of the band Smith
 Haley McCormick (bc. 1985), American television and film actress
 Jill McCormick (born 1977), US fashion model
 Larry McCormick (1933–2004), US television personality
 Lisa McCormick (f. 1990–2000s), US singer and songwriter
 Malcolm McCormick (1992–2018), birth name of Mac Miller, American rapper and singer 
 Matt McCormick (f. 1990–2000s), US film producer and director
 Maureen McCormick (born 1956), US television and film actress
 Megan McCormick (born 1973), US television personality
 Pat McCormick, US film actor and screenwriter
 Pat McCormick (f. 1950-1980s), US television personality
 Peter Dodds McCormick (1834?–1916), Australian songwriter, composer of Australian anthem
 Robert "Mack" McCormick (1930–2015), US musicologist and folklorist
 Sierra McCormick (born 1997), US film actress

Fiction
 Dan McCormick, fictional character in the film Man Made Monster
 Kenny McCormick, fictional character in the animated series South Park.
 Helen and Bartley McCormick, fictional characters in The Cripple of Inishmaan (play by Martin McDonagh)

Law
 Andrew Phelps McCormick (1832–1916), US federal judge
 John E. McCormick ( 1924–2010), Longest serving Wisconsin circuit judge and Wisconsin State Assemblyman

Navy
 Lynde D. McCormick (1895–1956), Four-Star Admiral, Commander in Chief of the United States Atlantic Fleet, First supreme allied commander of all NATO forces in the Atlantic
 Robert McCormick (explorer) (1800–1890), British Royal Navy surgeon, explorer and naturalist

Politics
 Adelbert J. McCormick (1845–1903), US member of the New York State Assembly
C. L. McCormick (1919–1987), Illinois politician and businessman
 Dale McCormick (born 1947), US senator from Maine
 George M. McCormick (1841–1913), Illinois state senator
 Henry C. McCormick (1839–1902), US Representative from Pennsylvania
 Hope Baldwin McCormick (1919–1993), US member of the Minnesota House of Representatives
 James Robinson McCormick (1824–1897), US Representative from Missouri
 Joseph Medill McCormick (1877–1925), US Representative and Senator from Illinois
 Larry McCormick (born 1940), Canadian Member of Parliament
 Norma McCormick (born 1944), Canadian Member of the Legislative Assembly
 Richard Cunningham McCormick (1832–1901), Governor of Arizona Territory and US Representative from New York
 Robert Sanderson McCormick (1849–1919), US diplomat
 Ruth Hanna McCormick (1880–1944), US Representative from Illinois
 Terri McCormick, US member of the Wisconsin Assembly
 John P. McCormick, Political Journalist (Chicago Tribune, Newsweek)

Sports
 Andrew McCormick (rugby union) (born 1967), New Zealand-born Japanese rugby player
 Bob McCormick, Scottish footballer
 Chas McCormick (born 1995), US baseball player
 Cody McCormick (born 1983), Canadian ice hockey player
 Daniel McCormick (born 1986), US Olympic judoka
 Debbie McCormick (born 1974), Canadian-born US curler
 Enda McCormick (born 1997/8), Irish Gaelic footballer
 Ernie McCormick (1906–1991), Australian cricketer
 Fergie McCormick (born 1939), New Zealand rugby player
 Frank McCormick (1911–1982), US baseball player
 Guillermo Mc Cormick  (1938–2005), Argentine rugby union player
 Hugh J. McCormick (1854–1911), Canadian speed skater, World Professional Speed Skating Champion 1890–92
 Jim McCormick (1856–1918), Scottish-born US baseball player
 Jim McCormick (1884–1959), US football player
 Judy McCormick, All-American Girls Professional Baseball League player
 Kelly McCormick (born 1960), US diver
 Luke McCormick (born 1983), English footballer
 Luke McCormick (born 1999), English footballer
 Mike McCormick (born 1938), US baseball player
 Moose McCormick (1881–1962), US baseball player
 Nick McCormick (born 1981), English long-distance runner
 Pat McCormick (born 1930), US diver
 Ricky McCormick (born 1952), American water skier
 Sincere McCormick (born 2000), American football player
 Stan McCormick (f. 1940-1970s), English rugby player and coach
 Steve McCormick (born 1969), Scottish footballer
 Tim McCormick (born 1962), US basketball player
 Tom McCormick (1930–2012), American football halfback for the Los Angeles Rams and San Francisco 49ers
 Tom McCormick (boxer) (1890–1916), welterweight boxer of the 1910s

Other
 Arthur David McCormick (1860–1943), British artist
 Cami McCormick, American news reporter for CBS
 Donald B. McCormick (born 1932), American biochemist
 Edith Rockefeller McCormick (1872–1932), US socialite and opera patron
 Eric Hall McCormick (1906–1995), New Zealand historian
 Katherine McCormick (1875–1967), US biologist, suffragette, philanthropist
 James McCormick (1910–1940), IRA member, perpetrator of the 1939 Coventry bombing
 John Wesley McCormick (1754–1837), early US settler in Indiana
 Malky McCormick, Scotland's best known cartoonist and caricaturist
 Nancy Fowler McCormick (1835–1923), US philanthropist.  Widow of Cyrus McCormick
 Ricky McCormick (murder victim) (1958–1999), a man who died mysteriously. Found in St. Charles, Missouri with two encrypted notes

See also
 MacCormick
 McCormack
 Cormac
 Carmack
 McCormick (disambiguation)

References

English-language surnames
Anglicised Irish-language surnames
Anglicised Scottish Gaelic-language surnames
Patronymic surnames
Surnames from given names

fr:McCormick
ja:マコーミック